LDK may refer to:

 Ceritinib or LDK378, a drug used for the treatment non-small cell lung cancer
L.D.K. Lounge Designers Killer, a 2005 album by Japanese band Capsule.
 LDK, an abbreviation for Living room, Dining room, Kitchen for housing options in Japan.
 L DK, a romantic comedy manga series by Ayu Watanabe.
 LDK Solar Co, a Chinese company that manufactures  crystalline solar wafers
 Campus Dakwah Institute (Lembaga Dakwah Kampus), a term for Islamic student organization in Indonesia
 Democratic League of Kosovo (Lidhja Demokratike e Kosovës), a political party in Kosovo
 Lidköping-Hovby Airport, IATA airport code
 Grand Duchy of Lithuania (Lietuvos Didžioji Kunigaikštystė), a medieval state in Eastern Europe  

 Lycée de Kigali, a secondary school in Kigali, Rwanda